Cyrus Atabay (6 September 1929 – 26 January 1996) was a Persian-German poet. He mostly wrote in German and also translated works of Persian literature into German. Atabay was decorated on numerous occasions for his literary efforts, including the Adelbert von Chamisso Prize in 1990 and the Hugo-Jacobi-Preis in 1957.

Biography 
Cyrus Atabay was born in Tehran as the son of Hadi Atabay and Hamdamsaltaneh Pahlavi, the first daughter of Reza Shah. Before turning 8 years old, Cyrus was sent to Berlin by his father to attend school; he lived in Germany during World War II. After the war, he lived in Iran and Switzerland. In Switzerland, Cyrus's talent for poetry was noted by author Max Rychner, and in Germany by Gottfried Benn; both wrote positively about him. His works were published for the first time in 1948 in Die Tat ("The deed"), a Swiss journal. In 1951, Cyrus returned to Germany from Switzerland and studied literature at Ludwig Maximilian University of Munich (1952–1960). As a student in Munich, his "first three poetry collections" were published, in 1956, 1958 and 1960 respectively. In 1965, Cyrus published his first work of translation, consisting of a selection of ghazals originally written by the Medieval Persian poet Hafez. In 1978, Cyrus moved to London where he met Elias Canetti and Erich Fried. He moved back to Germany in 1983 where he lived until his death.

Awards
1957: Hugo-Jacobi-Preis 
1983: full member of the Bayerische Akademie der Schönen Künste (Bavarian Academy of Fine Arts))
1990: Adelbert von Chamisso Prize 
1993: Member of Deutsche Akademie für Sprache und Dichtung (the German Academy for Language and Literature)

Publications
Die Worte der Ameisen. Düsseldorf: Classen Verlag, 1971, 100 pp.
Gesange von Morgen: Neue Iranische Lyrik. Hamburg: Classen Verlag, 1968, 126 pp.
Hafis, Rumi, Omar Chajjam; übertragen von Cyrus Atabay: Die schönsten Gedichte aus dem klassischen Persien. Herausgegeben und mit einem Nachwort Versehen von Kurt Scharf. 4th ed. Munich: C. H. Beck, 2015.

References

Sources
 

20th-century Iranian poets
People of Pahlavi Iran
1929 births
1996 deaths
Iranian writers in German
Iranian expatriates in Germany
German-language poets
Translators from Persian
Writers from Tehran
Ludwig Maximilian University of Munich alumni
Iranian expatriates in England